Alfred Müller (born 16 June 1948) is a retired East German swimmer. He won a silver medal in the 4×200 m freestyle relay at the 1966 European Aquatics Championships. Two years later his team finished seventh in this event at the 1968 Summer Olympics.

References

1948 births
Sportspeople from Gera
German male swimmers
Living people
Olympic swimmers of East Germany
Swimmers at the 1968 Summer Olympics
German male freestyle swimmers
European Aquatics Championships medalists in swimming
East German male swimmers
People from Bezirk Gera